Michael Andrew Hollick (born August 5, 1973) is an American actor. He is best known for providing the voice and motion capture of Niko Bellic in the 2008 video game Grand Theft Auto IV.

Early life
Michael Andrew Hollick was born in Brooklyn, New York on August 5, 1973. He attended Carnegie Mellon University, where he received a Bachelor of Fine Arts degree.

Career
Hollick has appeared in plays like De La Guarda, Fuerzabruta on off-Broadway, and Tarzan and Jumpers on Broadway. Other credits include minor TV roles in Law & Order, Hawaii Five-0, Law & Order: Criminal Intent, Law & Order: Special Victims Unit and Sex and the City. Hollick played the villainous character Scar in the Las Vegas production of The Lion King.

In 2004, he was hired by Rockstar Games to provide the voice and motion capture of Niko Bellic in their video game Grand Theft Auto IV, which was released in April 2008. After the game's release, Hollick argued that he was not paid enough for his work, having received $100,000 for his work while the game grossed $600 million in total.

Personal life
Hollick lives in Las Vegas. In 2007, he married actress Angela Tsai. On July 22, 2010, Tsai gave birth to their son, Maxwell Ming Hollick. In 2015, she gave birth to their daughter Eva.

Filmography

Film

Television

Video games

Theatre

Awards and nominations

References

External links 
 

1973 births
Living people
American male film actors
American male television actors
American male video game actors
American male voice actors
People from Brooklyn
Carnegie Mellon University College of Fine Arts alumni
Male actors from New York City
20th-century American male actors
21st-century American male actors
Spike Video Game Award winners